Zurab Khizanishvili (born 6 October 1981) is a Georgian football coach, currently the assistant manager of Georgia U-21, and former footballer who played as a defender.

Club career

Early career
Khizanishvili started his career at Dinamo Tbilisi where he remained for just one season, before joining FC Tbilisi to improve his chances of playing regular first team football.

In 1999, he was on the move again, joining his previous two clubs' city rivals Lokomotiv Tbilisi. Khizanishvili's form at Lokomotiv piqued the interest of some of Europe's top clubs, though the player's latter days at the club were marred by injury. Khizanishvili was eventually released after his contract with Lokomotiv was terminated.

Scotland
In March 2001, Khizanishvili joined Dundee, having had unsuccessful trials at Arsenal, Fulham and West Ham United.

He quickly made an impact at Dens Park, alerting fellow Scottish Premier League team Rangers, whom Khizanishvili joined on a Bosman transfer in July 2003 as a replacement for Blackburn Rovers-bound defender Lorenzo Amoruso.

England
Despite making 35 appearances in his first campaign at Ibrox, Khizanishvili gradually fell out of favour and, on 31 August 2005, he was allowed to move on loan for the rest of the season to Blackburn in the English FA Premier League. During his loan spell at Blackburn he scored once in the league, in a 2–0 home win over Manchester City, and once in the League Cup in a 3–1 win over Huddersfield Town.

On 10 April 2006, he signed a permanent deal with Blackburn Rovers in a deal rumoured to be worth around about £500,000. He was a key part of Blackburn's team in the 2006-07 season, starting more than half the matches as the club competed domestically and in the UEFA Cup. Khizanishvili struggled to hold down a regular starting position in the rest of Mark Hughes' reign as manager.

Under Paul Ince and Sam Allardyce he also failed to break into the first team on a consistent basis. His first appearance of the 2009–10 campaign came on 25 August, when he started the League Cup 2nd Round tie against Gillingham at Priestfield Stadium, playing the full 90 minutes alongside Gael Givet in a 3–1 win. On 17 September 2009 Khizanishvili joined Championship team Newcastle United on loan in a three-month deal and returned on 19 December. On 25 January 2010, he signed for Reading on loan for the remainder of the 2009–10 season. 

On 31 August 2010, he rejoined Reading on a season long loan for the 2010–11 season and was handed the number 15 shirt at the Madejski Stadium. On 13 March 2011, Khizanishvili completed the full 90 minutes against Manchester City at Eastlands in a 1–0 FA Cup quarter-final loss. On 30 May 2011, he started the Championship play-off final against Swansea City. Khizanishvili was booked after 12 minutes and then conceded a penalty kick after 20 minutes, due to a clumsy challenge on winger Nathan Dyer and Reading went on to lose 4–2. Khizanishvili ended his second loan spell with Reading having made 29 appearances in all competitions, including 24 league outings.

Turkey
After his release from Blackburn, Khizanishvili joined Kayserispor, where he played for three seasons.

Azerbaijan
In June 2015, Khizanishvili signed a six-month contract with Azerbaijan Premier League side Inter Baku PIK.

International career
Khizanishvili played 93 matches for Georgia national football team. He scored his only goal against Moldova on 6 June 2009.

Coaching career
After he retired from football in the summer 2017, Khizanishvili was appointed as the assistant manager of Gia Geguchadze at the Georgian U-21 national team.

Personal life
Khizanishvili is married to the Georgian model Salome Ghviniashvili and they have three children. He is the son of former USSR international defender Nodar Khizanishvili.

Career statistics

Club
Sources:

International goals

Honours

Club
Rangers
League Cup: 2004–05
Scottish Premier League: 2004–05

Individual
SFWA Young Player of the Year: 2002–03

References

External links

1981 births
Footballers from Tbilisi
Living people
Footballers from Georgia (country)
Georgia (country) international footballers
Georgia (country) under-21 international footballers
Association football central defenders
FC Dinamo Tbilisi players
Dundee F.C. players
Rangers F.C. players
Blackburn Rovers F.C. players
Newcastle United F.C. players
Reading F.C. players
Shamakhi FK players
Erovnuli Liga players
Scottish Premier League players
Premier League players
English Football League players
Süper Lig players
Azerbaijan Premier League players
Expatriate footballers from Georgia (country)
Expatriate footballers in England
Expatriate footballers in Scotland
Expatriate footballers in Turkey
Expatriate footballers in Azerbaijan
Expatriate sportspeople from Georgia (country) in England
Expatriate sportspeople from Georgia (country) in Scotland
Expatriate sportspeople from Georgia (country) in Turkey
Expatriate sportspeople from Georgia (country) in Azerbaijan